Derek Anthony Gallop (born 26 June 1951) is a former English cricketer.  Gallop was a right-handed batsman who bowled left-arm fast-medium.  He was born in Bristol.

Gallop made his debut for Oxfordshire in the 1976 Minor Counties Championship against Berkshire.  Gallop played Minor counties cricket for Oxfordshire from 1976 to 1984, which included 36 Minor Counties Championship matches and 2 MCCA Knockout Trophy matches.  He made his List A debut against Warwickshire in the 1980 Gillette Cup.  He played 2 further List A matches, against Glamorgan in 1981 and Warwickshire in 1984.  In his 3 List A matches, he took 6 wickets at a bowling average of 34.50, with best figures of 2/39.

References

External links
Derek Gallop at ESPNcricinfo
Derek Gallop at CricketArchive

1951 births
Living people
Cricketers from Bristol
English cricketers
Oxfordshire cricketers